Madjid Bouabdellah (born October 30, 1981 in Ivry-sur-Seine, France) is an Algerian football player who is currently playing as a forward for MC Alger in the Algerian Championnat National.

References

1981 births
Living people
People from Ivry-sur-Seine
Algerian footballers
French sportspeople of Algerian descent
AS Cannes players
FC Sète 34 players
French footballers
Ligue 2 players
Paris FC players
US Créteil-Lusitanos players
Pau FC players
Association football forwards
Footballers from Val-de-Marne